Massachusetts House of Representatives' 7th Suffolk district in the United States is one of 160 legislative districts included in the lower house of the Massachusetts General Court. It covers part of the city of Boston in Suffolk County. Democrat Chynah Tyler of Roxbury has represented the district since 2017.

The current district geographic boundary overlaps with those of the Massachusetts Senate's 2nd Suffolk district and 2nd Suffolk and Middlesex district.

Representatives
 Samuel Hatch, circa 1858-1859 
 Patrick Riley, circa 1858-1859 
 John Doherty, circa 1888 
 Thomas G. Farren, circa 1888 
 Seth Fenelon Arnold, circa 1920 
 William J. Conlon, circa 1920 
 Davis B. Keniston, circa 1920 
 Thomas E. Linehan, circa 1930s
 William F. Carr, circa 1951 
 James Francis Condon, circa 1951 
 Michael E. Haynes
 Raymond L. Flynn, circa 1975 
 Doris Bunte
 Gloria Fox, 1985-2017 
 Chynah Tyler, 2017-current

See also
 List of Massachusetts House of Representatives elections
 Other Suffolk County districts of the Massachusetts House of Representatives: 1st, 2nd, 3rd, 4th, 5th, 6th, 8th, 9th, 10th, 11th, 12th, 13th, 14th, 15th, 16th, 17th, 18th, 19th
 List of Massachusetts General Courts
 List of former districts of the Massachusetts House of Representatives

Images
Portraits of legislators

References

External links
 Ballotpedia
  (State House district information based on U.S. Census Bureau's American Community Survey).
 League of Women Voters of Boston

House
Government of Suffolk County, Massachusetts